Operation Sea Breeze may refer to:

Operation Sea Breeze (Sri Lanka) by the Sri Lankan Military in 1990
Gaza flotilla raid by the Israeli Navy in 2010
 Exercise Sea Breeze, an annual multinational Partnership for Peace (PFP) maritime exercise held in the Black Sea involving Standing NATO Maritime Group 2 and other PFP navies

See also
 Sea Breeze (disambiguation)